Nisha Millet (born 20 March 1982) is a swimmer from Bengaluru, Karnataka, India.  An Arjuna Award winner, she was the only woman in the 2000 Sydney Olympics swim team for India.

Career
Millet had a near-drowning experience at the age of 5 years, following which her father insisted she overcame her fear and learn how to swim. In 1991, Millet learned how to swim under the guidance of her father, Aubrey at Shenoynagar Club, Chennai. By 1992, Millet had won her first state-level medal in 50m freestyle, in Chennai.

Her parents moved to Bangalore to further her swimming training and career. She attended Sophia High School in Bangalore.

In 1994, while still a sub-junior, Millet won all five freestyle gold medals at the Senior National Level and beat India's top swimmers. The same year, she also won her first international medal at the Asian Age Group Championships in Hong Kong.

Millet represented India at the 1998 Asian Games (Thailand), World Championships (Perth 1999, Indianapolis 2004) and won medals for the country at both the Afro-Asian Games and SAF Games. She was the only Indian athlete to win 14 gold medals at the National Games in 1999. At the peak of her career, Millet represented India at the 2000 Sydney Olympics in the 200m freestyle, where she won her heat, but failed to qualify for the semi-finals. She was the first Indian woman to meet the B Qualification timings for the Olympics. After undergoing back surgery in 2002, she narrowly missed out on the 2004 Olympic qualification and decided to retire from competitive swimming due to the heavy financial burden on her parents.

She credits a large part of her success to Pradeep Kumar at the Basavanagudi Aquatic Centre.

Millet held the national record/Best Indian performance in the 200m and 400m freestyle for 15 years, ending in 2015. She also holds the distinction of being the first female Indian swimmer to break the one-minute barrier in the 100m freestyle.

Awards
 Prime Minister's award for best sportswoman of the national games - 1997 and 1999.
 Highest Gold medals (14) in sports in the Manipur National Games - 1999
 Arjuna Award given to highest sports person in India - 2000
 Rajyotsava Award - 2001
 Karnataka State Ekalavya Award - 2002
 Afro-Asian games, women's backstroke Silver medal - 2003

See also
 India at the 2000 Summer Olympics
 Basavanagudi Aquatic Centre

References

External links
 
Nisha Millets Home Page

1982 births
Living people
Indian female swimmers
Indian female freestyle swimmers
Indian female backstroke swimmers
Olympic swimmers of India
Swimmers at the 2000 Summer Olympics
Swimmers from Bangalore
Sportswomen from Karnataka
Recipients of the Arjuna Award
Recipients of the Ekalavya Award
South Asian Games medalists in swimming
South Asian Games gold medalists for India
20th-century Indian women
20th-century Indian people